David Hixon (born December 3, 1952) is a retired American college basketball head coach who spent 42 years coaching Amherst College. As head coach, he transformed the Amherst men's basketball program into one of the best in the nation. He was inducted into the New England Basketball Hall of Fame in 2003.

Coaching career
The Andover, Massachusetts native was a member of the Amherst College men's basketball team while studying psychology. He graduated in 1975.

His father Wil Hixon was a basketball coach at the high school level, best known for his stint at Andover High School where he also coached his son. Father and son won a state championship in 1970. Both were inducted into the New England Basketball Hall of Fame in 2003.

Hixon compiled a coaching record of 826-293, ranking him 15th in NCAA men's basketball when he retired in April 2020. He had a winning percentage of .738, good for a 10th place in NCAA Division III history, at the time of his retirement. He was named NABC NCAA Division III Coach of the Year in 2007 and 2013. He won national championships with Amherst in 2006-07 and 2012-13. In 2008, he reached the national championship game with his squad, where they suffered defeat to Washington (MO). In 2004, 2006, 2014, 2016, he led Amherst to the national semifinals.

Under his tutelage, Amherst participated in the NCAA national tournament 20 times and compiled a 43-20 postseason record. However, due to New England Small Conference Athletic Conference (NESCAC) rules, his Amherst team was ineligible for NCAA postseason play until 1994. He took on arch rival Williams College 21 times during his coaching career, winning 17.

Several of Hixon's players went on to play professionally, including players like Andrew Olson (played in Germany; All-American in 2007 and 2008), Willy Workman (plays in Israel; All-American in 2013), Kevin Hopkins (played in Germany), Fletcher Walters (played in Germany and Luxemburg), Pat Fitzsimmons (played in Germany and Ireland), Brian Baskauskas (played in Denmark; All-American in 2009).

Other standout players of his Amherst tenure include Aaron Toomey (2014 D3hoops.com NCAA Division III Player of the Year, also All-American in 2012 and 2013), John Bedford (2006 All-American), Andrew Schiel (2005 All-American), Steve Zieja (2003 All-American), Jamal Wilson (1997 All-American), Conor Meehan, Jordan Moss (both All-Americans in 2011).

Throughout his coaching career, Hixon received interest from NCAA Division I schools, especially from the Ivy League. In 2008, he was a candidate to become the new head coach of Bucknell University. Hixon declined the offer, but suggested Dave Paulsen of Amherst's rival Williams College as a candidate. Paulsen eventually ended up getting the Bucknell job.

On September 16, 2019 it was announced that Hixon would be taking a leave of absence for the 2019-2020 season, and that assistant coach Aaron Toomey would be the interim head coach. On April 13, 2020 Hixon announced his retirement.

Hixon also coached soccer and track at Amherst. On May 7, 2022, the floor at Amherst's LeFrak Gymnasium was named Hixon Court.

Family 
His wife Mandy, a member of the United States International Diving Team from 1980 to 1984, served as diving coach at Amherst College, Williams College and the University of Massachusetts Amherst. She was also an assistant Professor of Physical Education, Coordinator of Aquatics, assistant Director of Intramurals and assistant coach of field hockey, lacrosse and tennis. Their son Michael won a silver medal at the 2016 Olympic Games in diving.

See also
 List of college men's basketball coaches with 600 wins

References

1952 births
Living people
American men's basketball coaches
Amherst Mammoths men's basketball coaches
Amherst Mammoths men's basketball players
Basketball coaches from Massachusetts
College men's basketball head coaches in the United States
Isenberg School of Management alumni
People from Andover, Massachusetts
Sportspeople from Essex County, Massachusetts